Prithvi (Sanskrit:  "Earth") is a tactical surface-to-surface short-range ballistic missile (SRBM) developed by Defence Research and Development Organisation (DRDO) of India under the Integrated Guided Missile Development Program (IGMDP). It is deployed by India's Strategic Forces Command.

Development and history 
The Government of India launched the Integrated Guided Missile Development Program in 1983 to achieve self-sufficiency in the development and production of wide range of ballistic missiles, surface-to-air missiles etc. Prithvi was the first missile to be developed under the program. DRDO attempted to build a surface-to-air missile under Project Devil. Variants make use of either liquid or both liquid and solid fuels. Developed as a battlefield missile, it could carry a nuclear warhead in its role as a tactical nuclear weapon.

Variants 
The Prithvi missile project encompassed developing three variants for use by the Indian Army, Indian Air Force and the Indian Navy. The initial project framework of the Integrated Guided Missile Development Program outlines the variants in the following manner.
Prithvi I (SS-150) – Army version ( range with a payload of )
Prithvi II (SS-250) – Air Force version ( range with a payload of )
Prithvi III (SS-350) – Naval version ( range with a payload of )

Description

Prithvi I 
This class of Prithvi missile was inducted into the Indian Army in 1994. As Per (DRDO)'s former Chief Avinash Chander , the tactical 150 km-range Prithvi missile will be replaced with the Prahaar missile, which is more capable and has more accuracy. According to Chander, the Prithvi I missiles withdrawn from service would be upgraded to be used for longer ranges.

Prithvi II 
It was developed with the Indian Air Force being the primary user. It was first test-fired on 27 January 1996 and the development stages were completed in 2004. This variant has been inducted into the army as well. The missile features measures to deceive anti-ballistic missiles.

The missile was inducted into India's Strategic Forces Command in 2003, and it was the first missile developed under the IGMDP. After a failed test on 24 September 2010, two more missiles aimed at two different targets were launched on 22 December 2010 and were successful. On June 2, India successfully test-fired its indigenous nuclear-capable Prithvi-II missile. The launch happened at the Integrated Test Range at Chandipur in Odisha at 9:50am. The missile, capable of carrying payloads of up to 1,000 kg, was inducted into the armed forces in 2003. It is the first to be developed by the Defence Research and Development Organization under its Integrated Guided Missile Development Programme.

India's Strategic Forces Command test launched two short-range nuclear capable ballistic missiles at night as part of its annual training cycle to test the combat readiness of the Indian Army's missile forces. Two Prithvi-II tactical surface-to-surface short-range ballistic missiles were test fired from the Integrated Test Range (ITR) on Dr. Abdul Kalam Island in the Bay of Bengal off the coast of Odisha at nighttime on November 20. The missile launches took place between 7 p.m. and 7:15 p.m., according to government sources cited in local media reports. The trial of the surface-to-surface missile with a strike range of 350 km was carried out from a mobile launcher from launch complex-3 of the ITR at 7:05 pm, sources told India Today TV, adding it was a routine trial.

India on Tuesday conducted a night trial of its indigenously developed, nuclear-capable surface-to-surface Prithvi-II missile off Odisha coast.
The Strategic Forces Command conducted the night trial of short-range ballistic missile Prithvi-II from launch complex-3 of Integrated Test Range in Chandipur.Defence sources said that the missile has strike range of 350 km, was test-fired at 7.48 p.m. on Tuesday 04 Dec. The Strategic Forces Command conducted night trial of Prithvi II in full operational configuration from Launch Complex III of Integrated Test Range on 23 September 2020.

Prithvi III 
Prithvi III class is a two-stage surface-to-surface missile. The first stage is solid fueled with a 16 metric ton force (157 kN) thrust motor. The second stage is liquid-fueled.

The missile was launched from the updated reinforced helicopter deck of the vessel. The first flight test of the  variant was only partially successful. The full operational testing was completed in 2004.

Dhanush (missile) 

Dhanush (Sanskrit: धनुष, "Bow") is a variant of the surface-to-surface or ship-to-ship Prithvi III missile, which has been developed for the Indian Navy. It is capable of carrying both conventional as well as nuclear warheads with pay-load capacity of 500 kg-1000 kg and can strike targets in the range of 350 km. Dhanush is a system consisting of a stabilization platform and the missile. It is a customized version of the Prithvi and is certified for sea worthiness. Dhanush has to be launched from a hydraulically stabilized launch pad. Its low range acts against it and thus it is seen as a weapon either to be used to destroy an aircraft carrier or an enemy port. The missile has been tested from surface ships of the navy many times.

History
It was the sixth test of the missile.

The missile was test-fired successfully on 5 October 2012, on 23 November 2013, 9 April 2015, and 24 November 2015 from Indian Navy ship INS Subhadra (P51) in the Bay of Bengal off the Orissa coast.

Dhanush was again tested on November 26, 2015 from INS Subhadra in the Bay of Bengal.

A successful user trial was conducted from a naval ship on 23 February 2018 by the Strategic Forces Command off the Odisha coast.

Capabilities
The Dhanush missile can be used as an anti-ship weapon as well as for destroying land targets depending on the range.

See also

Other Indian missile projects
 Project Devil
 SS-45 Missile
 Project Valiant
 Indian Ballistic Missile Defence Programme
 K Missile family

Comparable missiles
 Ghaznavi
 Abdali-I
 Shaheen-I
 J-600T Yıldırım
 Fateh-313
 Qiam 1
 B-611
 DF-11
 Al Hussein (missile)
 Burkan-1
 Sky Spear

References

External links 

 CSIS Missile Threat - Prithvi I/II/III
 CSIS Missile Threat - Dhanush

Technical:
 DRDO Technology Focus : Warhead for Missiles, Torpedoes and Rockets

Short-range ballistic missiles
Ballistic missiles of India
Defence Research and Development Organisation
Military equipment introduced in the 1990s